Cho Se-Kwon (born June 26, 1978) is a South Korean former professional football player.

As a player he represented Chunnam Dragons, Ulsan Hyundai Horang-i, Goyang Kookmin Bank as well as Chinese  clubs Liaoning Hongyun and Chongqing Lifan. While internationally he was a part of the South Korea U23 team that took part in the 2000 Summer Olympics.

Career statistics

Honours
Ulsan Hyundai Horang-i
K-League: 2005
Liaoning Hongyun
China League One: 2009

References

External links
 
 N-League Player Record - 조세권 
 National Team Player Record 
 
 

1978 births
Living people
Association football defenders
South Korean footballers
South Korean expatriate footballers
South Korea international footballers
Ulsan Hyundai FC players
Jeonnam Dragons players
Goyang KB Kookmin Bank FC players
Liaoning F.C. players
Chongqing Liangjiang Athletic F.C. players
Chinese Super League players
China League One players
K League 1 players
Korea National League players
Footballers at the 2000 Summer Olympics
Olympic footballers of South Korea
Expatriate footballers in China
South Korean expatriate sportspeople in China
Korea University alumni
Footballers at the 1998 Asian Games
Asian Games competitors for South Korea